The Church of the Holy Communion is a historic Episcopal church building on Summit Street in Norwood, Bergen County, New Jersey, United States.

It was designed by J. Cleaveland Cady in Late Gothic Revival style and Shingle Style and was built in 1886.  It was added to the National Register of Historic Places in 1988.

History
Episcopal services service in Norwood began in the local Presbyterian Church about 1870. Norwood was a weekend and vacation resort for New Yorkers at the time, and the parish served these visitors throughout much of its history.  Official consent to form a church parish was given on  October 14, 1878, by Bishop Odenheimer of the Diocese of Newark.

Land for the church was donated Mr. and Mrs. George W Luckey. Construction began in 1876 and was completed in 1877. This building was destroyed by fire on November 6. 1886.  Following the original plans, a new building, costing $8,229.69, was completed in 1888. A Carrara marble altar and a Tiffany window depicting the Resurrection were donated by the William H. Oakley family. An organ built by the J.H. & C.S. Odell Organ Builders was donated by the Suydam family.

A parish hall was built in 1930 and an education building in 1969. From 1980 to 1987 the church shared a rector and administrative services with nearby St. Andrew's Episcopal Church in Harrington Park.

See also 
 National Register of Historic Places listings in Bergen County, New Jersey
 Church of the Holy Communion and Buildings, a deconsecrated church in Manhattan, New York City

References

Churches on the National Register of Historic Places in New Jersey
Gothic Revival church buildings in New Jersey
Churches completed in 1886
19th-century Episcopal church buildings
Episcopal church buildings in New Jersey
Churches in Bergen County, New Jersey
Shingle Style church buildings
National Register of Historic Places in Bergen County, New Jersey
Norwood, New Jersey
New Jersey Register of Historic Places
Shingle Style architecture in New Jersey